Mycena tintinnabulum is a European species of agaric fungus in the family Mycenaceae. The mycelium, but not the fruit body, is bioluminescent.

See also
List of bioluminescent fungi

References

External links

tintinnabulum
Bioluminescent fungi
Fungi described in 1783
Fungi of Europe